Killer.com is a 2015 legal suspense thriller by Kenneth G. Eade. The novel is a fictional legal thriller and courtroom drama about a mob of anonymous cyber stalkers on the Internet who go too far and enlist the services of a killer for hire.  The novel raises the issues of cyber stalking and cyber bullying, as well as use of the Dark Net.

Overview
This was Eade's seventh novel, and the fifth in his Brent Marks series of legal thrillers. The story takes place largely in Los Angeles, California.

Plot summary
In Killer.com, a group of anonymous cyber stalkers post defamatory matter about lawyer Brent Marks on the Internet.  After he sues them for libel, his case is dismissed as a strategic lawsuit against public participation.  When a killer-for-hire shows up on the scene, Marks finds himself accused of murder.

Inspiration
Eade was inspired to write a fictional story which exposes the issue of cyber bullying and how the Internet is used anonymously to hurt others.

Reception
Midwest Book Review said, "Those who enjoy Grisham and other legal studies and who appreciate more than a dose of reality in their fiction reads will find Killer.com to be one of Eade's most powerful works yet, providing a scenario firmly grounded in real possibilities and powerfully enhanced by a questionable, surprise outcome in an exquisitely well-done, complex thriller!"

References

External links
 Kenneth Eade's official website

2015 American novels
American thriller novels
Legal thriller novels
Novels set in Los Angeles
Political thriller novels
American political novels
CreateSpace books